is a 2011 Japanese anime television series produced by Brain's Base. The series is directed and co-written by Kunihiko Ikuhara and aired in Japan from July 8 to December 23, 2011. The series revolves around the Takakura twins Kanba and Shoma whose dead younger sister Himari was brought back to life by a strange spirit who resides in a penguin-shaped hat. However, in exchange for extending her life, the spirit tasks them to seek out an item known as the Penguin Drum with assistance from a trio of strange penguins.

Penguindrum's two opening themes are performed by Etsuko Yakushimaru. Eight pieces of music are used for ending themes. "Dear Future" by Coaltar of the Deepers is used for episodes 1–12, with a special performance by Yui Horie for episode 10.

Episode list
All episodes were co-written by Kunihiko Ikuhara and Takayo Ikami. Episode 16 was also co-written with Shingo Kaneko and Tomohiro Furukawa. In intertitles, the episodes are referred to as ordered "stations" (from "1st Station" up to "24th Station").

Home video releases

Japanese release

Italian release

References

External links
 
Tenth anniversary website 

Penguindrum